This is a list of the municipalities in the state of Mato Grosso (MT), located in the Central-West Region of Brazil. Mato Grosso is divided into 141 municipalities, which are grouped into 22 microregions, which are grouped into 5 mesoregions.

See also
Geography of Brazil
List of cities in Brazil

Mato Grosso